Lorella, formerly Haynesville, is an unincorporated community in Klamath County, Oregon, United States. It lies southeast of Bonanza along East Langell Valley Road. The Lost River flows through the Langell Valley and near Lorella.

It became known as Lorella, for a local resident, on December 13, 1894, shortly after the establishment of a post office on August 3, 1887. Joseph K. Haynes was first postmaster. The office closed in March 1930.

References

Unincorporated communities in Klamath County, Oregon
1887 establishments in Oregon
Populated places established in 1887
Unincorporated communities in Oregon